Hog's Tooth is the name given to the 7.62×51mm NATO round presented to a United States Marine upon graduating from the Scout/Sniper school. A 7.62×51mm NATO round is used because that is the round fired by the M40A6, which is the primary rifle used by Marine snipers.

Significance
According to military superstition, there is ultimately one round destined to end the life of each person, "the bullet with your name on it." Until that round is fired, the person for which it is intended is invincible. If the sniper carries this round at all times, it can never be fired and the sniper is therefore untouchable.

The term "HOG" is claimed to be an acronym derived from the title "Hunter of Gunmen", which is the colloquial name for a sniper who killed an enemy sniper in combat. He then has to take a round from the enemy sniper's chamber — the one "with his name on it". The bullet is then worn as a necklace and symbolizes the tooth of a real hog, expressing his status as a "Hunter of Gunmen".

All other members of a scout sniper platoon who have not graduated as a HOG are each considered a "PIG", or "Professionally Instructed Gunman".

See also
Scout Sniper

United States Marine Corps